Caranus or Karanos was the first king of the ancient kingdom of Macedonia according to later traditions. According to Herodotus, however, the first king was Perdiccas I. Caranus is first reported by Theopompus and is the mythical founder of the Argead dynasty.

Myth 
According to a Greek myth, Caranus was the son of Temenus, king of Argos, who in turn was a Heraclid, a descendant of Heracles. Plutarch agrees on the Heraclid lineage of Caranus and argues that Alexander the Great is a descendant of Heracles through Caranus. Temenus, along with Cresphontes and Aristodemus were the three Doric leaders who invaded the Mycenean Peloponnese region. Then they proceeded to divide the conquered territories between them. Cresphontes was given Messenia and Sparta; Aristodemus took Laconia; and finally Temenus was given Argos. Following the death of Temenus, the princes argued about who should be king. One of them, Pheidon, defeated his brothers in battle and took over the kingship. Caranus then decided to find another kingdom of his own, where he could be king. First, however he went to the Oracle of Delphi to ask Pythia's advice. "You should find your kingdom there, where you will find plenty of game and domestic animals, she advised." Thus Caranus and his entourage moved to the North, in search of suitable land to establish his new kingdom. Finally, he discovered a green valley, with a lot of game and goats, whereupon he thought that the prophecy of Pythia had been fulfilled. Thus he built a city there, which he named Aigai, present day Vergina, a site of substantial archaeological activity, as numerous important findings have been unearthed.

View of historians 
According to Justin (7.1) citing Marsyas of Pella

According to Chronicon (Eusebius)

According to Livy (The History of Rome, 45.9.3)

See also
Heracleidae

References

Dictionary of Greek and Roman Biography and Mythology Caranus

8th-century BC Macedonian monarchs
Argead kings of Macedonia
Mythology of Macedonia (ancient kingdom)
Legendary Greek people